SS Donegal was a Midland Railway passenger ferry that served in the First World War as an ambulance ship. She was completed in 1904 and sunk by enemy action in April 1917.

Building and peacetime service
In 1897–1903 the Midland Railway of England had Heysham Port on the coast of Lancashire built as a terminal for ferries to and from Ireland. In 1903 the Midland established its interest in Ireland by buying the Belfast and Northern Counties Railway.

In 1904 the Midland took delivery of a pair of new passenger ferries from Clydeside shipyards in Glasgow to work between Heysham Port and Belfast Harbour. They came from different builders but they were sister ships:  built by John Brown & Company of Clydebank, and Donegal built by Caird & Company of Greenock.

She and Antrim worked between Heysham and Belfast from 1904 until they were requisitioned for UK Government service in the First World War.

War service and loss

Donegal was one of numerous ferries, many of them requisitioned from railway companies, that were converted into ambulance ships to carry wounded personnel from France back to Great Britain. Ambulance ships were classified as hospital ships under Hague Convention X of 1907 and as such were to be clearly marked and lit to make them easy to identify. Nevertheless, in the First World War the Imperial German Navy attacked and sank a number of British hospital ships. The UK Government then announced it would cease marking hospital ships, alleging that German vessels had used their markings and lighting to target them, so Donegal was unmarked.

On 1 March 1917 a German submarine tried to attack Donegal but the steamer managed to outrun her. Then on 17 April 1917 both Donegal and a larger ship, were sunk by U-boats when carrying British wounded across the English Channel.

Donegal had sailed from Le Havre bound for Southampton carrying 610 lightly wounded soldiers and 70 crew. She had a Royal Navy escort. She sank with the loss of 29 wounded British soldiers and 12 of her crew.

A Royal Naval Reserve Lieutenant, H Holehouse, jumped from his ship into the sea to recover one of Donegals wounded soldiers from the water. The man did not recover, but the Royal Humane Society awarded Lieut. Holehouse its bronze medal.

Titanic connections
Jewell had been one of Titanics lookouts (although not on watch when she struck the iceberg) and Priest had been one of her stokers.

Priest then served on the armed merchant cruiser  when she and the German armed merchant cruiser  sank each other in February 1916. Both Jewell and Priest then served on Titanics White Star Line sister ship , and survived when she was sunk in November 1916. When Donegal sank, Priest survived yet again but Jewell was killed. In 1917 Priest was awarded the Mercantile Marine Ribbon for his service in the war.

Wreck

See also
List of hospital ships sunk in World War I

References

Sources

1904 ships
Ships built on the River Clyde
Ferries of the United Kingdom
Steamships of the United Kingdom
Ships of the Midland Railway
Passenger ships of the United Kingdom
Maritime incidents in 1917
Ships sunk by German submarines in World War I
World War I shipwrecks in the English Channel